Oru Naal Innoru Naal is a 1985 Indian Malayalam-language film,  directed by T. S. Suresh Babu and produced by Sreevigneswara Films. The film stars Prem Nazir, Shankar, Shobhana and Nedumudi Venu. The film has musical score by M. G. Radhakrishnan.

Cast

Prem Nazir
Sukumari
Shobhana
Nedumudi Venu
Thikkurissy Sukumaran Nair
Ratheesh
Shankar
Bheeman Raghu
Jagadish
Jagannatha Varma
Jayaprabha
K. P. Ummer
Karamana Janardanan Nair
Poojappura Ravi
Santhakumari
Vettoor Purushan
Gomathi

Soundtrack
The music was composed by M. G. Radhakrishnan with lyrics by Chunakkara Ramankutty.

References

External links
 
 oru nal innorunal

1985 films
1980s Malayalam-language films
Films directed by T. S. Suresh Babu